Frans Möller may refer to:

Frans Möller (tennis) (1886–1954), Swedish tennis player
Frans Möller (swimmer) (1897–1995), Swedish swimmer